International Rally Championship (released on PlayStation as Tommi Mäkinen Rally in UK) is a rally racing video game which is a part of the Rally Championship series. The Windows version was developed by Magnetic Fields and published by Europress, and released on 30 June 1997. The PlayStation version was solely ported and published by Europress.

It is a sequel to the Network Q RAC Rally Championship. It would in turn be succeeded in 1999 by Mobil 1 Rally Championship.

Gameplay
It offers 16 new tracks set in various locations around the world and new features, such as Track Editor and playable up to 8 players via LAN.

The featured cars were the Ford Escort, Mitsubishi Lancer, Nissan Almera, Proton Wira, Renault Mégane, Škoda Felicia, Subaru Impreza, Toyota Corolla and Volkswagen Golf.

Reception 

French magazine Génération 4 awarded four star "hit" rating to the game and commended improved graphics over previous title in the series and inclusion of level editor, but criticized availability of only 15 new tracks (in comparison to 30 in Rally Championship).

References

External links

Demo version at Internet Archive

1997 video games
Interplay Entertainment games
Multiplayer and single-player video games
PlayStation (console) games
Racing video games set in the United States
Rally racing video games
THQ games
Video game sequels
Video games developed in the United Kingdom
Video games with user-generated gameplay content
Windows games
Magnetic Fields (video game developer) games